Carl Lorenz Cervantes (born November 27, 1994) is a Filipino actor and author.

Personal life 
Cervantes graduated in 2015 with a Bachelor of Science in Psychology from the Ateneo de Manila University. He became known after joining GMA Network’s reality show, Starstruck 6. Since then, he has bagged various roles in GMA shows such as Magpakailanman, Maynila, and Meant To Be. He has also appeared as a guest or segment host in various shows on GMA News and Public Affairs, such as Good News and AHA!. In 2020, he went viral for dressing up as the mayor of Pasig city, Vico Sotto.

Interests 
Cervantes has a social media page on the psychology of Philippine spirituality. He has also written a short book on the matter.

Filmography

Television

Published Works

Books 

 Deep Roots: Essays on the Psychic and Spiritual in Philippine Culture. KamitHiraya, 2022.

Journal Articles 

 The Limitations and Potentials of Tarot Readings in Times of Uncertainty. Diliman Review, 2021.

References 

General
 'StarStruck' acting test (Carl Cervantes vs Migo Adecer)  Retrieved 2017-06-09
 StarStruck 6 UPDATE: Carl Cervantes, Faith Da Silva, Mariam Al-Alawi, and Kyle Vergara eliminated from GMA-7's artista search Retrieved 2017-06-09

External links 
 

1994 births
Living people
Ateneo de Manila University alumni
Filipino male television actors
21st-century Filipino male singers
Participants in Philippine reality television series
StarStruck (Philippine TV series) participants
GMA Network personalities